Pemptolasius humeralis is a species of beetle in the family Cerambycidae, and the only species in the genus Pemptolasius. It was described by Gahan in 1890.

References

Apomecynini
Beetles described in 1890
Monotypic beetle genera